South End is the tentatively named and planned light rail infill station in Charlotte, North Carolina. The at-grade dual side platforms are to be a stop along the Lynx Blue Line, serving South End and reconnecting the nearby Dilworth and Brookhill neighborhoods. CATS expects the station to open in 2026.

Location 
The station will be located on the Blue Line tracks between New Bern and East/West Boulevard stations, The platforms are in a split configuration, with the northbound platforms behind Publix and the southbound behind Sycamre/Atherton Lofts. Part of the reason for the selectred station site is to provide a safe level crossing to access the grocery store from the north side of the tracks, as jumping the gates to cross the railway line had become an issue.

References

External links
 South End station
 South End Charlotte

Future Charlotte Area Transit System stations
Railway stations scheduled to open in 2026